The following is a list of churches in Mid Devon.

Active churches 
There are churches in every civil parish. The district has an estimated 113 churches for 79,800 people, a ratio of one church to every 706 inhabitants.

Defunct churches

References 

Mid Devon
 
Churches